Grewcock's sportive lemur (Lepilemur grewcockorum), or the Anjiamangirana sportive lemur, is a sportive lemur endemic to Madagascar. Grewcock's sportive lemur is found in northwestern Madagascar, living in dry deciduous forests.

Originally named L. grewcocki, the name was found to be incorrectly formed and was corrected to L. grewcockorum in 2009.

It was also found to be synonymous with the Manasamody sportive lemur (Lepilemur manasamody), known for its primarily grey-brown coloration and known only from Ambongabe and Anjiamangirana I (between the Sofia River in the south and the Maevarano River in the north).  The decision was made because the sampling sites were within  of each other, and no geographic barrier could be identified.

References

Sportive lemurs
Mammals described in 2006